This is a list of mammals of Texas, those mammals native to or immediately off the coast of the U.S. state of Texas.

The varying geography of Texas, the second largest state, provides a large variety of habitats for mammals. The land varies from swamps, Piney Woods in the east, rocky hills and limestone karst in the central Hill Country of the Edwards Plateau, desert in the south and west, mountains in the far west (the Trans-Pecos), and grassland prairie in the north, also known as the Panhandle. The state's many rivers, including the Rio Grande, the Colorado River, and the Trinity River, also provide diverse river habitats. Its central position in the United States means that species found primarily in either the western or eastern reaches of the country often have their ranges meeting in the state. Additionally, its proximity to Mexico is such that many species found there and into Central America also range as far north as Texas.

Texas recognizes three official mammals: the nine-banded armadillo, the Texas Longhorn, and the Mexican free-tailed bat. State law protects numerous species.

List of species

Order Xenarthra

Dasypodidae
Dasypodidae is a family of armoured mammals found mainly in Latin America.

Order Chiroptera

Phyllostomidae

Mormoopidae

Vespertilionidae

Molossidae

Order Carnivora

Canidae

Felidae

Procyonidae

Mephitidae

Mustelidae

Phocidae

Ursidae

Order Artiodactyla

Tayassuidae

Cervidae

Antilocapridae

Bovidae

Order Eulipotyphla

Soricidae

Talpidae

Order Sirenia

Trichechidae

Order Didelphimorphia

Didelphidae

Order Lagomorpha

Leporidae

Order Rodentia

Castoridae

Cricetidae
Northern pygmy mouse (Baiomys taylori)
Mexican vole (Microtus mexicanus)
Woodland vole (Microtus pinetorum)
Prairie vole (Microtus ochrogaster)
White-throated woodrat (Neotoma albigula)
Florida woodrat (Neotoma floridana)
Mexican woodrat (Neotoma mexicana)
Southern plains woodrat (Neotoma micropus)
Golden mouse (Ochrotomys nuttalli)
Muskrat (Ondatra zibethicus)
Chihuahuan grasshopper mouse (Onychomys arenicola)
Northern grasshopper mouse (Onychomys leucogaster)
Coues' rice rat (Oryzomys couesi) 
Marsh rice rat (Oryzomys palustris)
Texas mouse (Peromyscus attwateri)
Brush mouse (Peromyscus boylii)
Cactus mouse (Peromyscus eremicus)
Cotton mouse (Peromyscus gossypinus)
Southern deer mouse (Peromyscus labecula)
White-footed mouse (Peromyscus leucopus)
White-ankled mouse (Peromyscus pectoralis)
Northern rock mouse (Peromyscus nasutus)
Western deer mouse (Peromyscus sonoriensis)
Pinyon mouse (Peromyscus truei)
Eastern harvest mouse (Reithrodontomys humulis)
Fulvous harvest mouse (Reithrodontomys fulvescens)
Western harvest mouse (Reithrodontomys megalotis)
Plains harvest mouse (Reithrodontomys montanus)
Tawny-bellied cotton rat (Sigmodon fulviventer)
Hispid cotton rat (Sigmodon hispidus)
Yellow-nosed cotton rat (Sigmodon ochrognathus)

Erethizontidae

Geomyidae
Yellow-faced pocket gopher (Cratogeomys castanops)
Desert pocket gopher (Geomys arenarius)
Attwater's pocket gopher (Geomys attwateri)
Botta's pocket gopher (Thomomys bottae)
Baird's pocket gopher (Geomys breviceps)
Plains pocket gopher (Geomys bursarius)
Knox Jones's pocket gopher (Geomys knoxjonesi)
Texas pocket gopher (Geomys personatus)
Llano pocket gopher (Geomys texensis)

Heteromyidae
Hispid pocket mouse (Chaetodipus hispidus)
Rock pocket mouse (Chaetodipus intermedius)
Nelson's pocket mouse (Chaetodipus nelsoni)
Desert pocket mouse (Chaetodipus penicillatus)
Gulf Coast kangaroo rat (Dipodomys compactus)
Texas kangaroo rat (Dipodomys elator) 
Merriam's kangaroo rat (Dipodomys merriami)
Ord's kangaroo rat (Dipodomys ordii)
Banner-tailed kangaroo rat (Dipodomys spectabilis)
Mexican spiny pocket mouse (Liomys irroratus)
Plains pocket mouse (Perognathus flavescens)
Silky pocket mouse (Perognathus flavus)
Merriam's pocket mouse (Perognathus merriami)

Sciuridae
Texas antelope squirrel (Ammospermophilus interpres)
Black-tailed prairie dog (Cynomys ludovicianus)
Southern flying squirrel (Glaucomys volans)
Gray-footed chipmunk (Neotamias canipes)
Eastern gray squirrel (Sciurus carolinensis)
Fox squirrel (Sciurus niger)
Mexican ground squirrel (Spermophilus mexicanus)
Spotted ground squirrel (Spermophilus spilosoma)
Thirteen-lined ground squirrel (Spermophilus tridecemlineatus)
Rock squirrel (Spermophilus variegatus)

Order Cetacea

Balaenidae

Balaenopteridae

Kogiidae
Kogiidae is a family of whales.

Physeteridae
Physeteridae is a monotypic family of whales only containing the extant Physeter macrocephalus.

Ziphiidae

Delphinidae

Introduced/invasive mammals

Order Primates

Order Carnivora

Canidae (canids)

Order Artiodactyla

Suidae (pigs)

Cervidae (deer)

Bovidae (antelopes & sheep)

Order Rodentia

Muridae (Old World mice & rats)

Myocastoridae (Nutria)

See also 

 Geography of Texas
 List of amphibians of Texas
 List of reptiles of Texas
 List of birds of Texas

Notes and references

Notes

Citations

External links
American Society of Mammologists: Mammals of Texas
Handbook of Texas Online: Mammals
Texas Parks & Wildlife: Endangered and Threatened Species in Texas
The Mammals of Texas - Online Edition

Mammals
Texas